Alonso José Ricardo Lujambio Irazábal (2 September 1962 – 25 September 2012) was a Mexican academic and politician who served as Secretary of Public Education in the cabinet of President Felipe Calderón.

Lujambio served as member of the General Council of the Federal Electoral Institute (IFE), as advisor to the United Nations, and as an academic at the Ibero-American University, the National Autonomous University of Mexico (UNAM) and the Autonomous Institute of Technology of Mexico (ITAM), where he chaired the undergraduate program in Political Science.

On 11 November 2011, Lujambio was diagnosed with multiple myeloma, following a hospitalization for acute renal failure.

On 29 August 2012, Lujambio took protest as Senator, at which he was assisted in a wheelchair.

On 25 September 2012, Senator Alonso Lujambio died after complications from cancer.

References

External links 
Official page of Alonso Lujambio

Mexican Secretaries of Education
Instituto Tecnológico Autónomo de México alumni
Yale University alumni
Academic staff of the Instituto Tecnológico Autónomo de México
Academic staff of Universidad Iberoamericana
Academic staff of the National Autonomous University of Mexico
1962 births
2012 deaths
Deaths from multiple myeloma
21st-century Mexican politicians
Deaths from cancer in Mexico